Antoine François Passy (23 April 1792, Garches – 8 October 1873) was a French politician, geologist, and botanist.
He was sub-secretary of state for the Interior in the Cabinet of François-Pierre Guizot (19 September 1847 to 24 February 1848).

References

1792 births
1873 deaths
People from Hauts-de-Seine
Politicians from Île-de-France
Members of the 4th Chamber of Deputies of the July Monarchy
Members of the 5th Chamber of Deputies of the July Monarchy
Members of the 6th Chamber of Deputies of the July Monarchy
Members of the 7th Chamber of Deputies of the July Monarchy
French geologists
19th-century French botanists
Members of the French Academy of Sciences
Passy family